Kamna Chandra is an Indian writer who has written plays for All India Radio and stories and dialogues for the screen which include the films Chandni, 1942: A Love Story (directed by her son-in-law Vidhu Vinod Chopra), Prem Rog and the television show Kashish.

Biography
Kamna hails from Muzaffarnagar  and did part of her schooling from MKP College, Dehradun, after which she did her bachelor's degree from Allahabad University, and was then married to business executive Navin Chandra. She is the mother of author Vikram Chandra, film critic Anupama Chopra (who is married to filmmmaker Vidhu Vinod Chopra) and film director Tanuja Chandra. Her granddaughter, through Anupama, Zuni Chopra is also a writer.

Filmography

References

External links
 

Year of birth missing (living people)
Living people
Indian women screenwriters
Indian television writers
People from Muzaffarnagar
Indian women television writers
Women writers from Uttar Pradesh
20th-century Indian women writers
20th-century Indian dramatists and playwrights
Hindi screenwriters
Screenwriters from Uttar Pradesh
University of Allahabad alumni